The R938 road is a short regional road in Ireland linking Castleblayney town centre and the nearby N53 in County Monaghan.

See also 

 Roads in Ireland
 National primary road
 National secondary road

References 

Regional roads in the Republic of Ireland
Roads in County Monaghan